Dobi is a family name (surname) originating in Hungary. It is mostly prevalent in Hungary, Albania, Serbia and the United States.

Etymology 

The surname may originate from the Hungarian personal name Dabó (Transylvanian form Dobó), or from a pet form of the personal name Dob.
 Another theory on the origin of the Dobi surname may be as a diminutive of the Saxon personal name Hrodebert (ancient form of the English name Robert).

Dobi surname in Albania 

The Dobi surname in Albania is found among members of the same family, which originates from the region of Gjirokastra, and nowadays hails primarily in the capital city of Tirana, but a large number of them have settled in other countries, such as Turkey or the United States.

History 

The main branch of the Dobi family in Albania is considered to be one of the oldest families of the medieval city of Gjirokastra and it is believed that they had first settled in the citadel inside the Castle of Gjirokastra by the year 1380. Since then, there have been 30 generations of people with the Dobi surname.

A line of the Dobi family had established landholdings in the village of Damës, in the region of Tepelena, but by the end of the 16th century most of them had moved to Gjirokastra and the cadet branch of the family that stayed back in Damës formed the core of the Iliriani family.  According to legend, throughout the centuries the Dobi family has been involved mainly with commerce, especially in the trade of mules for transport, which helps explain the presence of the mule in escutcheon of the Family's heraldic coat of arms.

By the 1780s, members of the Dobi family started spreading from their dwellings inside the Castle to other areas of the city, mainly in the "Hazmurat" neighborhood.  These new dwellings were mainly of 2 to 3 stories high and surrounded by thick stone walls. In architectural style, they were similar to the other tower houses typical of Gjirokastra, the most famous of which being the Zekate House.  Throughout the years, the Dobi family continued growing and expanding throughout the city in other desirable neighborhoods, such as "Upper Palorto", "Lower Palorto", "Manalat" and "Cfarkë", and by 1945 they were considered to be one of the largest families of Gjirokastra, with 6 major branches.

Members of the Dobi family of Gjirokastra have been active in the struggle for Albanian Independence and in WWII fighting against fascism, where is worth mentioning Istref Dobi, who at 17 years of age took part in the armed conflict for the liberation of Vlora in 1920, or the 12 members of the Dobi family who were active in the Antifascist National Liberation Movement of Albania during WWII.

After the end of WWII, many members of the Dobi family moved from Gjirokastra towards the capital city, Tirana, a process which had started since the 1930s, and as a consequence there are only 3 families bearing the Dobi surname living in Gjirokastra at the moment.

In addition to migration inside of Albania, many members of the Dobi family emigrated to other countries, especially to Thessaloniki in modern-day Greece or the cities of Istanbul and Izmir in Turkey. In the 1990s, as with many other Albanians, many members of the Dobi family emigrated towards the United States, and nowadays Albanians with the Dobi surname have settled primarily in the states of New York, New Jersey, Massachusetts and Pennsylvania.

Notable Albanians with the Dobi surname 

Most of the members of the Dobi family of Albania have traditionally been involved with commerce and civil administration, being well-respected in the fields of jurisprudence, education, military, engineering and natural sciences. In these fields, it is worth noting the contribution of Kledin Dobi in mathematics; Haki Dobi in finance; Arben Dobi and Drini Dobi in health care.  Also, successors of the Dobi family of Gjirokastra have been involved in Albanian politics, as is the case of Bashkim Kopliku, former Deputy Prime Minister and former Minister of Internal Affairs of the Republic of Albania, the oldest son of lady Kadrie Dobi a respected lecturer of History and a graduate of the University of Rome. Others have affirmed themselves in the field of literature, where it is worth noting the poetry of Nesibe Dobi, believed to be the first female poet of Albanian literature, and Ismail Kadare an Albanian writer of world renown, and the son of lady Hatixhe Dobi.

Among many others, the following are some notable holders of the Dobi surname:

 Nesibe Dobi, according to Robert Elsie she is considered the first female poet of Albanian literature, having written her first poems in 1897.
 Hoxhë Dobi, popular poet of the 19th century and grandfather of Ismail Kadare.
 Haxhi Dobi, high-ranking military commander and chief of staff of Ali Pashë Tepelena.
 Namik Dobi, high-ranking Ottoman military commander, educated in the then Military Academy of Istanbul.
 Abdulla Dobi, educated in jurisprudence in Istanbul and served as Ottoman Kadi of Kruja, Kavaja and Peqin.
 Basri Dobi, served as Ottoman Kadi of Izmir in Turkey and Bosra in Siria.
 Selman Dobi, educated in jurisprudence in Istanbul and served as Vice-Prefect of Tepelena until 1912.
 Fejzi Dobi, educated in jurisprudence at the Sorbonne and renowned attorney during the 1930s.
 Vejsel Dobi, educated in jurisprudence at the Ottoman University of Thessaloniki and served as Ottoman Imperial judge in the Dardanelles, and following Albanian independence served as trial judge in Kolonjë and Elbasan and as an inquisitorial judge in Shkodra.
 Servet Dobi, treasurer of the Vatra, the Pan-Albanian Federation of America, during the 1930s.
 Qemal Dobi, graduate of the Sorbonne in mechanical engineering and renowned engineer.
 Eqerem Dobi, architect and civil engineer, responsible for projecting the Palace of Culture of Tirana, Director of the Institute of Civil Project and later Head of Albanian Architecture Department at the Ministry of Infrastructure of Albania.
 Agim Dobi, graduate of the Charles University in Prague and professor of geology at the National Institute of Geology.
 Gëzim Dobi, physicist and majority shareholder of Infosoft, one of the biggest IT corporations in Albania.
 Ermal Dobi, attorney and former Vice Minister of Justice of the Republic of Albania.

Notable people 

 István Dobi (1898–1968), Hungarian politician, Prime Minister of Hungary 1948–52.
 Edina Dobi (born 1987), Hungarian volleyball player
 Enkeleid Dobi (born 1975), Albanian footballer
 Kledin Dobi (born 1988), Albanian–American mathematician, minor planet 21517 Dobi is named after him

See also 

 21517 Dobi

References